Vietnam People's Air Force Museum, Ho Chi Minh City
 Vietnam People's Air Force Museum, Hanoi

Museums in Vietnam